The 2019 English Open (also known as the 19.com English Open due to sponsorship) was a professional snooker tournament that took place from 14 to 20 October 2019 at the K2 Leisure Centre in Crawley, England. It was the fourth ranking event of the 2019–20 snooker season and the first of the 2019 Home Nations Series. The event was the fourth edition of the English Open, first held in 2016. Betting company 19.com sponsored the tournament.

The defending champion was Stuart Bingham, who defeated Mark Davis 9–7 in the 2018 final. Bingham lost 1–4 to Si Jiahui in the second round of the tournament. Mark Selby defeated David Gilbert 9–1 in the final to win his 16th ranking title. 

A total of 71 century breaks were made during the tournament.

Format
The English Open was first played in 2016 as a world ranking tournament and a part of the Home Nations Series. The 2019 event was held in the K2 Leisure Centre, Crawley, England. The event was the fourth ranking tournament of the 2019–20 snooker season, and the first of four Home Nations Series events. The event followed the China Championship and preceded the World Open.

Stuart Bingham, who defeated Mark Davis 9–7 in the 2018 final was the defending champion. All matches were played as the best of 7  until the quarter-finals, at which point the number increased: 9 in the quarter-finals; 11 in the semi-finals; and the best of 19 frames in the final. Chinese sports prediction website 19.com sponsored the event, which was broadcast by Quest in the United Kingdom and the Republic of Ireland; in Europe by Eurosport; NowTV in Hong Kong; Superstars Online, Youku and Zhibo.tv in China; DAZN in Canada; Truesport in Thailand and Sky Sport in New Zealand.

Prize fund
The event's total prize fund was a total of £405,000, with the winner receiving £70,000. The breakdown of prize money for the tournament is shown below:

 Winner: £70,000
 Runner-up: £30,000
 Semi-final: £20,000
 Quarter-final: £10,000
 Last 16: £7,500
 Last 32: £4,000
 Last 64: £3,000
 Highest break: £5,000
 Total: £405,000

Summary

Rounds one to four were played between 14 and 17 October as the best of seven frames. Tian Pengfei defeated Gerard Greene, Alan McManus and Dominic Dale to reach the last 16 round. He met Si Jiahui, who had defeated the defending champion Stuart Bingham in the second round 4–1. Tian completed a whitewash over Si Jiahui. Tom Ford, seeded 24, completed 4–0 wins over Peter Lines and Lu Ning before defeating Kyren Wilson 4–2. In the last 16, Ford played Shaun Murphy, and made a maximum break in the final frame to win the match 4–3. Twelfth seed David Gilbert defeated Stuart Carrington, amateur Ryan Davies, Kurt Maflin to meet Zhao Xintong in the last 16, which he won 4–3. Ricky Walden received a bye in his second round match against Sam Craigie, after Craigie failed to arrive before defeating Michael Holt 4–3 to reach the last 16. There he met Thepchaiya Un-Nooh and won 4–2.

Chinese player Mei Xiwen defeated Yan Bingtao, Li Hang and Elliot Slessor. He met five-time World Snooker Championship winner Ronnie O'Sullivan, defeating him 4–3. Mark Selby, ranked sixth defeated Barry Pinches, Martin O'Donnell and Matthew Selt before defeating Xiao Guodong 4–1 to reach the quarter-finals. Mark Allen completed two whitewashes over Andy Lee and tenth seed Barry Hawkins to progress to the quarter-finals. World number 80 Lee Walker defeated Chen Zifan and Robbie Williams to play world number one Judd Trump in the last 32. Trump did not  a ball in the opening two frames as Walker won the match 4–2, and defeated Gary Wilson to reach the quarter-finals.

The quarter-finals were played on 18 October as the best of 9 frames. Ford completed a 5-0 whitewash over Tian. Allen defeated Walker, who won only frame 5. Selby defeated Mei, who had led by three frames. The semi-finals were played as the best of 11 frames on 19 October. The first was held as Gilbert defeated Ford 6–3. Allen and Selby faced off in the second semi-final, as Selby led 3–1 but later trailed 3–5. Selby took the last three frames to win the match 6–5.

The final was played on 20 October between Selby and Gilbert, as the best of 17 frames held over two . Selby won the first five frames with breaks of 88, 68, 79 and 85 before Gilbert won frame six with a century break. Selby won both of the two frames in the second session, with a century break in frame 10 to win 9–1. After the win, Selby commented, "It's been a long time since I won my last tournament .. I've been second guessing myself wondering if I am doing things right." He also commented that Gilbert would win a ranking event soon. This was the 16th career ranking win for Selby.

Main draw
The results from the event are shown below. Seeded players have their seedings in brackets. Players highlighted in bold denote match winners.

Top half

Section 1

Section 2

Section 3

Section 4

Bottom half

Section 5

Section 6

Section 7

Section 8

Finals

Final

Century breaks
A total of 71 century breaks were made during the event. The highest was a maximum break made by Ford in the final frame of his 4–3 win over Murphy.

 147, 128, 124, 102, 101  Tom Ford
 143  Barry Hawkins
 142  Dominic Dale
 142  Mark Williams
 141  Gary Wilson
 136, 134, 130, 127, 112, 101  David Gilbert
 136  Fergal O'Brien
 135, 108, 101  Judd Trump
 134, 102  Ronnie O'Sullivan
 134  Jimmy Robertson
 133  Shaun Murphy
 132, 130, 130, 103, 101  Mark Selby
 130  Riley Parsons
 129, 125, 100  Mark Allen
 128  Joe Perry
 128  Xiao Guodong
 127  Joe O'Connor
 126, 126  Lee Walker
 125, 124  Ricky Walden
 125, 121  Yan Bingtao
 124, 122, 122  Tian Pengfei
 122, 107  Michael Holt
 120  Mike Dunn
 120  Luo Honghao
 119  Zhou Yuelong
 118, 100  Neil Robertson
 118  Sunny Akani
 117, 104  Thepchaiya Un-Nooh
 115, 115, 101  Kurt Maflin
 114  Jamie O'Neill
 111, 103  Stuart Bingham
 108, 106  Mei Xiwen
 108  Ryan Day
 107  Hammad Miah
 106  Anthony McGill
 105  Zhang Anda
 104  Yuan Sijun
 103  Adam Stefanow
 103  Matthew Stevens
 102  Andy Lee
 100  Kacper Filipiak

References

Home Nations Series
2019
English Open
English Open (snooker)
October 2019 sports events in the United Kingdom
Sport in Crawley
2010s in West Sussex